is a Japanese former professional baseball infielder who is currently a scorer of Yomiuri Giants for Nippon Professional Baseball (NPB). He has played in NPB for the Chunichi Dragons and Giants.

Career
Chunichi Dragons selected Yoshikawa with the second selection in the 2010 NPB draft.

On September 13, 2012, Yoshikawa made his NPB debut.

On November 16, 2018, he was selected Yomiuri Giants roster at the 2018 MLB Japan All-Star Series exhibition game against MLB All-Stars.

On December 2, 2020, he become a free agent. On December 25, 2020, he announced his retirement and become a scorer of Giants.

References

External links

 NPB.com

1992 births
Living people
Baseball people from Osaka
Chunichi Dragons players
Japanese baseball players
Nippon Professional Baseball second basemen
Nippon Professional Baseball shortstops
Nippon Professional Baseball third basemen
Yomiuri Giants players